École nationale de la statistique et de l'analyse de l'information (ENSAI) a French engineering College created in 1994.

The school is the only engineering school entirely dedicated to the jobs of statistical engineering and information processing.

Located in Rennes since 1996, the ENSAI is a public higher education institution. The school is a member of the Conférence des Grandes Écoles (CGE).

References

External links
 ENSAI

Engineering universities and colleges in France
Rennes
ENSAI
Educational institutions established in 1994
1994 establishments in France